Reichertshausen is a municipality  in the district of Pfaffenhofen in Bavaria in Germany and is near the A9 and between Munich and Ingolstadt.

Geography 

The Bundesstrasse 13 (B13) runs through Reichertshausen. Also the river Ilm, which gives the valley (Ilmtal) its name and is a tributary to the Abens, runs through the town.

Districts 

 Bärnhausen
 Grafing
 Gründholm
 Gurnöbach
 Haunstetten
 Kreut
 Langwaid
 Lausham
 Salmading
 Oberpaindorf
 Paindorf
 Pischelsdorf
 Steinkirchen

References

Pfaffenhofen (district)